Battle Creek is a city in Madison County, Nebraska, United States. It is part of the Norfolk, Nebraska Micropolitan Statistical Area. The population was 1,207 at the 2010 census.

History
In 1859, following complaints of Pawnee depredations against settlers in the Elkhorn River valley, a combined force of Nebraska Territorial Militia under the command of General John Milton Thayer and 2nd U.S. Army Dragoons under Lieutenant Beverly Holcombe Robertson prepared to attack a Pawnee village.  Rather than fighting, the Pawnees surrendered before the attack could be launched. Chief Petalesharu draped an American flag over his shoulders and held a peace pipe while confronting the soldiers to stop the fight from taking place,
 ending the Pawnee War of 1859.  Although no battle occurred, the nearby stream was dubbed Battle Creek.  The town founded in the area in 1867 took the creek's name for itself.

Geography
Battle Creek is located at  (41.999047, -97.599005).

Demographics

2010 census
At the 2010 census there were 1,207 people in 457 households, including 321 families, in the city. The racial makeup of the city was 97.8% White, 0.1% African American, 1.2% Native American, 0.1% Asian, 0.5% from other races, and 0.4% from two or more races. Hispanic or Latino of any race were 0.8%.

Of the 457 households 39.2% had children under the age of 18 living with them, 59.1% were married couples living together, 7.7% had a female householder with no husband present, 3.5% had a male householder with no wife present, and 29.8% were non-families. 25.8% of households were one person and 14% were one person aged 65 or older. The average household size was 2.55 and the average family size was 3.08.

The median age was 39.7 years. 28.1% of residents were under the age of 18; 5.9% were between the ages of 18 and 24; 23.4% were from 25 to 44; 24.9% were from 45 to 64; and 17.6% were 65 or older. The gender makeup of the city was 48.2% male and 51.8% female.

2000 census
At the 2000 census, there were 1,158 people in 434 households, including 325 families, in the city. The population density was 1,784.6 people per square mile (687.9/km). There were 447 housing units at an average density of 688.9 per square mile (265.5/km). The racial makeup of the city was 97.41% White, 0.09% African American, 1.38% Native American, 0.43% from other races, and 0.69% from two or more races. Hispanic or Latino of any race were 1.04% of the population.

Of the 434 households 40.6% had children under the age of 18 living with them, 61.8% were married couples living together, 9.7% had a female householder with no husband present, and 25.1% were non-families. 23.3% of households were one person and 13.4% were one person aged 65 or older. The average household size was 2.67 and the average family size was 3.14.

The age distribution was 31.1% under the age of 18, 6.6% from 18 to 24, 28.8% from 25 to 44, 18.7% from 45 to 64, and 14.8% 65 or older. The median age was 35 years. For every 100 females, there were 96.3 males. For every 100 females age 18 and over, there were 90.0 males.

The median household income was $43,906, and the median family income  was $50,179. Males had a median income of $34,792 versus $20,536 for females. The per capita income for the city was $16,996. About 4.3% of families and 6.7% of the population were below the poverty line, including 5.4% of those under age 18 and 8.1% of those age 65 or over.

References

Cities in Nebraska
Cities in Madison County, Nebraska
Norfolk Micropolitan Statistical Area